"Relate" (stylised in uppercase) is a song performed by an Australian Christian pop duo For King & Country. The song was released as the lead single from their fifth studio album, What Are We Waiting For? (2022), on 6 August 2021. The song was written by Josh Kerr, Joel Smallbone, Luke Smallbone and Tayla Parx.

"Relate" peaked at No. 1 on the US Hot Christian Songs chart, and No. 6 on the Bubbling Under Hot 100 chart. The song was ranked by Billboard as the eleventh biggest Christian song in 2022. "Relate" received two GMA Dove Award nominations for Pop/Contemporary Recorded Song of the Year and Short Form Video of the Year (Concept) at the 2022 GMA Dove Awards, ultimately winning the Short Form Video of the Year (Concept) award.

Background
On 2 August 2021, For King & Country announced that they would release "Relate" on 6 August 2021, along with the song's music video premiering on Apple Music. The duo also announced that they were slated to perform the song live on the nationally syndicated morning talk show Fox & Friends.

On 28 January 2022, For King & Country and R3hab released a remix of the song.

Composition

Reception

Critical response
Jonathan Andre of 365 Days of Inspiring Media gave a positive review of "Relate", saying, "Standing at a bit under 3 minutes, both Joel and Luke deliver another compelling song about unity and seeing things from someone else's perspective." Andre opined that the song is "a firm sequel" to "Bleed the Same" by Mandisa.

Accolades

Commercial performance
"Relate" debuted at No. 46 on the US Christian Airplay chart dated 14 August 2021. "Relate" reached No. 1 on the Christian Airplay chart dated 11 December 2021.

"Relate" debuted at No. 15 on the US Hot Christian Songs chart dated August 21, 2021, concurrently charting at No. 4 on the Christian Digital Song Sales chart. The song reached No. 1 on the Hot Christian Songs chart dated February 12, 2022, following a surge in streams and digital downloads and thus becoming the duo's first No. 1 hit single on the chart.

Music videos
The music video of "Relate" premiered on Apple Music on 6 August 2021, and was later published on For King & Country's YouTube channel on 7 August 2021. The live performance video of "Relate" was released via YouTube on 6 August 2021. The official lyric video of the song was uploaded on YouTube on 10 August 2021.

Performances
On 18 March 2022, a video of "Relate" being performed by For King & Country in the Mojave Desert, was aired on The Kelly Clarkson Show.

Track listing

Charts

Weekly charts

Year-end charts

Release history

References

External links
 
 

2021 singles
2021 songs
For King & Country (band) songs
Contemporary Christian songs
Songs written by Joel Smallbone
Songs written by Tayla Parx